Under the Same Moon is a 2007 Mexican-American drama film in Spanish and English directed by Patricia Riggen (in her feature film directorial debut) and starring Kate del Castillo, Adrián Alonso, and Eugenio Derbez.

Plot 
The film tells the story of Rosario, a single mother who crossed the US/Mexican border, leaving behind her son, Carlitos. Rosario describes the area around the payphone to Carlitos in detail. Meanwhile, Carlitos lives in his hometown with his ill grandmother. On the day of his ninth birthday party, his aunt and uncle try to take custody of him to take the money Rosario sends to him every month.

When his grandmother dies, Carlitos finds the coyotes and crosses the border. After crossing the border, the coyotes are stopped for other offenses (several hundred dollars in unpaid parking tickets, expired tags) while their car is towed away with Carlitos still inside. At night, Carlitos escapes the vehicle and runs off, but unwittingly drops his money.

Carlitos reaches a bus station but can't buy a ticket because he is too young. Carlitos asks a man if he could buy him a ticket. Carlitos then realizes that he has lost his money. He offers the man $100 to drive him to the impound lot. When they arrive at the impound lot, Carlitos can't find the money. The man, upset, tries to sell Carlitos to a pimp. Reina takes Carlitos to live and work with other undocumented immigrants. The next day, while working, immigration police raid the building and arrest most of the workers. Carlitos and another worker named Enrique, who does not like Carlitos, escape.

Carlitos begins to follow Enrique as he leaves the farm. Enrique tells him to leave him alone and that he doesn't want to watch over him and not to follow him. Carlitos follows him anyway, and the two eventually end up hitchhiking to the city limits of Tucson. When they get out of the van, Enrique yells at Carlitos again for following him and tells the boy to go, so Carlitos begins to walk off in anger on his own. Enrique sees that some men are about to jump Carlitos to try and steal his backpack, and decides to save Carlitos. 

Carlitos manages to gain employment for both Enrique and himself in the restaurant. At the restaurant, Carlitos looks up his absent father, Oscar Aguilar Pons, and they meet. Oscar agrees to take Carlitos to Rosario, but later doesn't show, apparently having changed his mind, angering Carlitos. Enrique decides to take Carlitos to Los Angeles. The two take a bus ride and reach LA.

Carlitos and Enrique arrive in East LA at the address, only to find a PO box. Carlitos and Enrique decide to search the city for the payphone her mother calls from. After a day of unsuccessful searching, the two rest on a bench.

Then, Doña Carmen calls Rosario, letting her know that Carlitos crossed the border and that her mother is dead. Rosario decides to go back to Mexico to search for Carlitos, believing him to be deported, as she thinks Carlitos has no idea where to find her. When boarding the bus she sees a payphone out the window of the bus at the bus station, and she realizes that Carlitos does know where to find her.

In the morning, Enrique and Carlitos get surprised by a pair of cops, and Enrique, noticing that Carlitos is about to be apprehended, throws his coffee at the cops to distract them. Enrique shouts to Carlitos to run away, which he is able to do, but Enrique is arrested. He sacrificed his freedom for the boy he once had no intention of helping.

Carlitos finally finds the payphone. They see each other across the street. Rosario yells to her son not to cross yet. Finally, we see the crosswalk light go from the "red hand" light to the green "man walking" light, and we know that Carlitos and his mom will finally reunite. As soon as that light turns green, the credits roll.

Cast

Themes

Determination 
In Under the Same Moon, Riggen helps to show the power of determination. The character of Rosario displays many underlying feminist themes, since she is fighting for success for her family almost completely by herself. In Los Angeles, she experiences difficulties with finding work but keeps persevering so that she can see Carlos again. Additionally, the theme of determination can be seen in the way that Rosario is determined to find true love. When Paco proposes, she initially does not comply because she is determined to save her marriage for someone she is truly in love with.

Carlos also is determined to reunite with his mother again, which essentially drives the entire plot of the film. He faces many challenges on his journey, yet continues the journey because his sight is set on Los Angeles and his mother.

Love 
The theme of love is a central theme of the film as well. There is a sense of universal love in the sense that complete strangers, such as Enrique, sacrifice themselves for the love of others. Additionally, the closing scene of the reunion shows how the power of love is what led to the reunion of Rosario and Carlos. Riggen shows the challenges that immigration brings about, yet how love can overcome borders. In the end, love makes people move mountains.

Reception 
The film received generally favorable reviews from critics, getting a 73% fresh rating on Rotten Tomatoes with an average rating of 6.5/10. The website's consensus reads, "If Under the Same Moon is often manipulative, it is also heartfelt, and features strong performances from its leads." On Metacritic, 24 critics gave the film 59/100, meaning "mixed or average" reviews.

Critics have called it a “warm drama that humanizes America's current illegal immigration debate even as it sentimentally stacks the deck in favor of the undocumented”. Some critics have said the film relies heavily on sentiment, and therefore it “blunts the hard edges of immigration with a thick coating of preciousness”. Notably, the film received a standing ovation at Sundance.

Home media
Under the Same Moon was released on DVD June 17, 2008, in the United States.

References

External links 
 
 
 
 

2007 films
2000s Spanish-language films
2007 drama films
American drama films
Mexican drama films
Films directed by Patricia Riggen
Films about illegal immigration to the United States
2007 directorial debut films
Films scored by Carlo Siliotto
Films about mother–son relationships
The Weinstein Company films
Fox Searchlight Pictures films
2000s English-language films
2000s American films
2000s Mexican films
Foreign films set in the United States